J. H. Wilkerson & Son Brickworks was a historic abandoned brickworks and national historic district located at Milford, Kent County, Delaware.  The district includes the sites of three contributing buildings and one contributing site at the brickworks that operated from 1912 to 1957.  The sheds, machinery, kiln, and other structures which housed the machinery remain standing, others have deteriorated or collapsed.  last standing werere the storage shed, the shed over the brick-making machine, and one of the drying sheds. All of the machinery was in place as were other pieces of equipment used in the brick-making process. The walls of the kiln remain standing, just as they would have been left after the fired bricks are removed.

It was listed on the National Register of Historic Places in 1978. It is listed on the Delaware Cultural and Historic Resources GIS system as destroyed or demolished.

References

External links

Brick Making Machine website

Historic American Engineering Record in Delaware
Industrial buildings and structures on the National Register of Historic Places in Delaware
Historic districts on the National Register of Historic Places in Delaware
Buildings and structures in Kent County, Delaware
Milford, Delaware
Kilns
Brickworks in the United States
National Register of Historic Places in Kent County, Delaware